Sarbjit Singh Bahga is an Indian architect, author and photo-artist. He is known for designing Vidya Sagar Institute of Mental Health, Amritsar, India which was featured in the Guinness World Records for Longest covered concrete corridor.

Career
Sarbjit Bahga obtained Bachelor of Architecture from Chandigarh College of Architecture in 1979. From 1980 to 2016, Bahga worked in the Department of Architecture, Punjab; Punjab Health Systems Corporation; and Punjab State Marketing Board on various positions. In 2016 he founded Bahga Design Studio LLP.
During his career spanning more than three-and-a-half decades he has designed many architectural projects which include administrative, recreational, educational, medical, residential, commercial, and agricultural buildings.
His selected works are published in the book titled Modern Regionalism: The Architecture of Sarbjit Bahga'.

Selected works
 Punjab Mandi Board Head Office, Mohali  
 Agriculture Bhawan, Mohali  
 Market Committee Office, Lehragaga 
 Sports Stadium, Badal 
 Sports Stadium, Bathinda 
 Hockey Stadium, Bathinda 
 Guru Gobind Singh Stadium, Jalandhar
 State Institute of Nursing and Paramedical Sciences, Badal 
 Dr. Vidyasagar Institute of Mental Health, Amritsar 
 Civil Hospital, Samana 
 Yatri Niwas, Talwandi Sabo  
 Fish market, Ludhiana  
 Centre of Excellence for Fruits, Hoshiarpur 
 Modern Cattle Sheds, Punjab 

Notable publications
 Modern Architecture in India: Post-Independence Perspective, Galgotia Publishing Company, 1993 
 New Indian Homes: An Architectural Renaissance, Galgotia Publishing Company, 1996 
 Le Corbusier & Pierre Jeanneret: Footprints on the Sands of Indian Architecture, Galgotia Publishing Company, 2000 
 Trees in Urban Habitat, White Falcon Publishing Solutions, 2014 
 Contemporary Indian Houses, White Falcon Publishing Solutions, 2014 
 Landscaping Human Habitat, White Falcon Publishing Solutions, 2015 
 Architectural Rendering: Hand-Drawn Perspectives and Sketches, White Falcon Publishing Solutions, 2021 
 New Indian Architecture: 1947-2020, White Falcon Publishing Solutions, 2022 

Awards and recognition
 Featured in the Guinness World Records for designing Longest covered concrete corridor'' (1018.89m) in Vidya Sagar Institute of Mental Health, Amritsar in 2014.
 World Architecture Community Award in the 13th Cycle, for the design of Market Committee Office, Lehragaga, Punjab in 2013.
 World Architecture Community Award in the 16th Cycle, for the design of CLTA Cafeteria, Chandigarh in 2014.
 World Architecture Community Award in the 17th Cycle, for the design of Nocturnal House, Chhatbir Zoo, Punjab in 2014.
 Celebration of Architecture Award for the designs of Multipurpose Sports Stadiums in Punjab by the Business India Exhibitions and Inside Outside Magazine in 2012.
 First Friday Forum Award For Creative Excellence in 2017.

References

External links
 

Living people
20th-century Indian architects
1957 births